OPTEC may refer to:

OPTEC, printed thin-film flat disc heating element by Russell Hobbs
OPTEC, Operational Test and Evaluation Command, predecessor of United States Army Test and Evaluation Command
OP-TEC, the National Center for Optics and Photonics Education
Optec Observatory, an observatory in Michigan, U.S.